Alfredo Emilio Sepúlveda Sandoval (born 3 August 1993) is a Chilean athlete specialising in the 400 metres hurdles. He won a silver medal at the 2018 South American Games in a new national record of 49.62.

International competitions

Personal best
Outdoor
200 metres – 21.92 (-1.9 ms/, Cochabamba 2018)
400 metres – 46.44 (São Paulo, 2018)
800 metres – 1:53.53 (Montevideo 2016)
400 metres hurdles – 49.62 (Cochabamba 2018)

References

1993 births
Living people
Chilean male hurdlers
Athletes (track and field) at the 2015 Pan American Games
Athletes (track and field) at the 2019 Pan American Games
Pan American Games competitors for Chile
Athletes (track and field) at the 2018 South American Games
South American Games silver medalists for Chile
South American Games bronze medalists for Chile
South American Games medalists in athletics
Competitors at the 2015 Summer Universiade
Competitors at the 2017 Summer Universiade
Ibero-American Championships in Athletics winners
21st-century Chilean people